Johnny Fa'auli (born 13 September 1995) is a New Zealand rugby union player for the  in the international Super Rugby competition and for Toshiba Brave Lupus in the Japanese Top League.

Youth career

Fa'auli was born in the Auckland suburb of Otahuhu and attended school at De La Salle College prior to moving to Saint Kentigern College for a rugby scholarship.

Senior career

He took his first steps in his senior career with his local provincial side, the Counties Manukau Steelers, for whom he made 10 appearances in 2015 before moving south to join the Taranaki Bulls in 2016.   3 tries in 10 appearances in a season which saw the Bulls reach the Premiership semi-finals before going down to Tasman represented a good first season for Taranaki.

Super Rugby

International

Fa'auli was a New Zealand Schools representative in 2013.

References

1995 births
Living people
New Zealand rugby union players
Rugby union centres
Taranaki rugby union players
Counties Manukau rugby union players
People educated at Saint Kentigern College
Chiefs (rugby union) players
Toshiba Brave Lupus Tokyo players
Samoan rugby union players
Japanese rugby union players
Shizuoka Blue Revs players